Crawfordsburn is a small village in County Down, Northern Ireland. The village, which is now effectively a commuter suburb, lies between Holywood and Bangor to the north of the A2 road, about 4 km west of Bangor town centre. Bounded to the north and north east by Crawfordsburn Country Park, the village attracts many visitors. It had a population of 587 people in the 2011 Census.

History
Before the Plantation of Ulster, the area of Crawfordsburn was known as Ballymullan. It was named after a stream which flows through the village.

Places of interest
The Old Inn, Crawfordsburn has been in existence since the 17th century. Records show this building to have been standing in its present form since 1614. There is evidence that substantial additions were made in the middle of the 18th century. In the 17th and 18th centuries, Donaghadee was one of the principal cross-channel ports between Ireland and Great Britain. The mail coach making connections with the sailing packet, changed horses at The Old Inn at Crawfordsburn and so it came to be patronised by many notable people including Swift, Tennyson, Thackeray, Dickens and Trollope. It was also frequented by C. S. Lewis.
Crawfordsburn Orange Hall.
At present it is used by the owners Crawfordsburn Chosen Few LOL 1091 who originally met in the old school house from 1905 and then bought their current building which is still in use to this day and continues to flourish with increased memberships. The hall is also used by Robert Whiteside Memorial LOL 1229 and Sir Henry Wilson RBP 1104. Also used by different community groups.
Crawfordsburn Scout Activity Centre is adjacent to the Country Park. It consists of 22 acres (9 hectares) of camping ground including several accommodation buildings. Originally part of the Sharman estate, it opened for Scout camping in October 1948.

People
Samuel Hall-Thompson (1885–1954) was a Unionist politician born in Crawfordsburn.

Sport
Bryansburn Rangers F.C. are an intermediate football club from the nearby town of Bangor, however their home 
ground Ballywooley is located on the Crawfordsburn Road on the way into the village.

2011 Census 
Crawfordsburn is classified by the NI Statistics and Research Agency (NISRA) as being within Belfast Metropolitan Urban Area (BMUA). On Census day (27 March 2011) there were 587 people living in Crawfordsburn. Of these:
18.2% were aged under 17 years and 27.4% were aged 65 and over
48.5% of the population were male and 51.5% were female
65.6% identified as Protestant, 23.4% as non-religious and 10.1% as Roman Catholic specifically.
1.5% of people aged 16–74 were unemployed

See also 
List of villages in Northern Ireland
List of towns in Northern Ireland

References

External links

Crawfordsburn Country Park
Culture Northern Ireland

Villages in County Down
Seaside resorts in Northern Ireland
Civil parish of Bangor